Kobyaki is a rural locality (a village) in Petushinskoye Rural Settlement, Petushinsky District, Vladimir Oblast, Russia. The population was 4 as of 2010. There are 2 streets.

Geography 
Kobyaki is located on the Laska River, 19 km north of Petushki (the district's administrative centre) by road. Yermolino is the nearest rural locality.

References 

Rural localities in Petushinsky District